Félix Ricardo Torres Rodríguez (born 28 April 1964) is a former football striker and coach from Paraguay.

Career
Torres started his career in Nacional of Paraguay where he made his professional debut in 1981. In 1983, he was signed by Hércules CF where he played two seasons before returning to Paraguay to play for Nacional and Sol de América where he became one of the key players in the obtention of the 1986 Paraguayan 1st division by being the team topscorer and overall topscorer of that year in Paraguay. He then played for Tigres UANL of Mexico before playing in Argentina for clubs like Mandiyú, Estudiantes LP, Racing Club and Platense. Torres also played for La Serena of Chile and returned to Paraguay to play for Olimpia where he won three 1st division titles before retiring.

Torres also played for the Paraguay national football team during the 1998 FIFA World Cup qualifiers.

Titles

Awards

References

External links
  
 Stats in Argentina at Fútbol XXI  

1964 births
Living people
Paraguayan footballers
Club Nacional footballers
Club Sol de América footballers
Tigres UANL footballers
Hércules CF players
Deportivo Mandiyú footballers
Estudiantes de La Plata footballers
Racing Club de Avellaneda footballers
Club Atlético Platense footballers
Deportes La Serena footballers
Club Olimpia footballers
Paraguay international footballers
Expatriate footballers in Spain
Expatriate footballers in Mexico
Expatriate footballers in Chile
Expatriate footballers in Argentina
Paraguayan expatriate footballers
Paraguayan expatriate sportspeople in Mexico
Paraguayan football managers
1987 Copa América players
1989 Copa América players
Club Olimpia managers
Club Sol de América managers
Association football forwards
Deportivo Capiatá managers